Choi Dong-gil (born 22 April 1970) is a South Korean weightlifter. He competed at the 1992 Summer Olympics and the 1996 Summer Olympics.

References

1970 births
Living people
South Korean male weightlifters
Olympic weightlifters of South Korea
Weightlifters at the 1992 Summer Olympics
Weightlifters at the 1996 Summer Olympics
Place of birth missing (living people)
Asian Games medalists in weightlifting
Weightlifters at the 1994 Asian Games
Asian Games silver medalists for South Korea
Medalists at the 1994 Asian Games
20th-century South Korean people
21st-century South Korean people